Goldthwaite High School is a 2A public high school located in Goldthwaite, Texas, United States. It is part of the Goldthwaite Consolidated Independent School District located in central Mills County.   In 2011, the school was rated "Recognized" by the Texas Education Agency.

Athletics
The Goldthwaite Eagles compete in the following sports:

 Cross Country 
 Football 
 Basketball
 Golf
 Track
 Softball 
 Baseball

State Titles
Football – 
1985(1A), 1993(2A), 1994(2A), 2009(1A/D1)
Boys Track – 
1966(1A)
One Act Play – 
1967(1A)
Boys Golf
2019 (2A)

State Finalists
Football –
1992(2A)
2010(1A)
One Act Play –
1989–90(2A) – 
1988–89(2A)

References

External links
Goldthwaite ISD

Schools in Mills County, Texas
Public high schools in Texas